In mathematics, in the field of algebraic number theory, a modulus (plural moduli) (or cycle, or extended ideal) is a formal product of places of a global field (i.e. an algebraic number field or a global function field).  It is used to encode ramification data for abelian extensions of a global field.

Definition

Let K be a global field with ring of integers R.  A modulus is a formal product

where p runs over all places of K, finite or infinite, the exponents ν(p) are zero except for finitely many p. If K is a number field, ν(p) = 0 or 1 for real places and ν(p) = 0 for complex places. If K is a function field, ν(p) = 0 for all infinite places.

In the function field case, a modulus is the same thing as an effective divisor, and in the number field case, a modulus can be considered as special form of Arakelov divisor.

The notion of congruence can be extended to the setting of moduli. If a and b are elements of K×, the definition of a ≡∗b (mod pν) depends on what type of prime p is:
if it is finite, then

where ordp is the normalized valuation associated to p;
if it is a real place (of a number field) and ν = 1, then

under the real embedding associated to p.
if it is any other infinite place, there is no condition.
Then, given a modulus m, a ≡∗b (mod m) if a ≡∗b (mod pν(p)) for all p such that ν(p) > 0.

Ray class group

The ray modulo m is

A modulus m can be split into two parts, mf and m∞, the product over the finite and infinite places, respectively. Let Im to be one of the following:
if K is a number field, the subgroup of the group of fractional ideals generated by ideals coprime to mf;
if K is a function field of an algebraic curve over k, the group of divisors, rational over k, with support away from m.
In both case, there is a group homomorphism i : Km,1 → Im obtained by sending a to the principal ideal (resp. divisor) (a).

The ray class group modulo m is the quotient Cm = Im / i(Km,1). A coset of i(Km,1) is called a ray class modulo m.

Erich Hecke's original definition of Hecke characters may be interpreted in terms of characters of the ray class group with respect to some modulus m.

Properties
When K is a number field, the following properties hold.
 When m = 1, the ray class group is just the ideal class group.
 The ray class group is finite.  Its order is the ray class number.
 The ray class number is divisible by the class number of K.

Notes

References

Algebraic number theory